Chief Judicial Magistrate's Court or Court of Chief Judicial Magistrate (abbreviated as CJM Court) is the second tier court in the criminal court structure in India. Court of Chief Judicial Magistrate is the apex body of the Criminal Judiciary at the district level, and it is presided over by the Chief Judicial Magistrate. The Chief Judicial Magistrate shall be the in-charge of the Magistrate Courts in the districts. Every district shall have a Chief Judicial Magistrate's Court and in addition to this there shall be additional Chief Judicial Magistrate's Courts. Judicial First Class Magistrates work under the Chief Judicial Magistrate. The Chief Judicial Magistrates are appointed by the respective High courts of India. The Chief Judicial Magistrates works under principal district judge. In the hierarchy of criminal courts, the Chief Judicial Magistrate's Court is below the Principal District and Sessions Court and above the Sub-Divisional Judicial Magistrate Court and the Judicial First Class Magistrate Court.

Jurisdiction 
The Chief Judicial Magistrate's Court exercises jurisdiction on original side in criminal matters arising in the district. The Court of Chief Judicial Magistrate may impose any punishment prescribed by law except death or imprisonment for life or imprisonment exceeding seven years.

CJM Court has jurisdiction to hear appeals against the judgment of the Subordinate Magistrate courts.
The Chief Judicial Magistrate Court has the power to award imprisonment up to seven years.
CJM Court has jurisdiction to try criminal offenses punishable with imprisonment for a term of 3 years to 7 years.
Original jurisdiction in criminal matters arising in the district.
Territorial jurisdiction as determined by the respective High Courts.

Appeals 
An appeal against the judgment of the Chief Judicial Magistrate's Court may be filed in the District Sessions Court.

Appointment 
In every district (not being a metropolitan area), the High Court shall appoint a Judicial Magistrate of the first class to be the Chief Judicial Magistrate.

Structure of Criminal Judiciary in india
Supreme Court of India (appex appellate court)

High Courts (appex appellate court in the states)

Metropolitan areas
Chief Metropolitan Magistrate Courts
Courts of Metropolitan Magistrates

District Level 
District level Criminal Judiciary is given below (ascending order):
 District and Sessions Court
Additional Sessions Court
 Assistant Sessions Court
 Chief Judicial Magistrate Court
Additional Chief Judicial Magistrate Court
Courts of Judicial Magistrate of First Class
 Courts of Judicial Magistrate of Second Class

See also 
 District Courts of India
 Sessions Court
 Courts of Metropolitan Magistrates, India
 Courts of Judicial Magistrate of First Class
 Courts of Judicial Magistrate of Second Class

References 

Judiciary of India
District Courts of India